Cabinet of Leszek Miller was appointed on 19 October 2001, passed the vote of confidence on 26 October 2001, and 13 June 2003.

The Cabinet

References

Miller, Leszek
Cabinet of Leszek Miller
2001 establishments in Poland
2004 disestablishments in Poland
Cabinets established in 2001
Cabinets disestablished in 2004